Robert Beaumont may refer to:
Robert de Beaumont, 1st Earl of Leicester (c. 1040/1050–1118), English and French nobleman
Robert de Beaumont, 2nd Earl of Leicester (1104–1168), Justiciar of England, 1155–1168
Robert de Beaumont, 3rd Earl of Leicester (died 1190), English nobleman
Robert de Beaumont, 4th Earl of Leicester (died 1204), English nobleman
Robert de Beaumont, Count of Meulan (c. 1142–1207), French nobleman
Robert Beaumont (Master of Trinity College) (died 1567), English educator
Bob Beaumont (1932–2011), American automobile manufacturer
Sir Robert Beaumont, character in the 1996 American film The Ghost and the Darkness
Robert Beaumont (fl. 1639), essayist